Salix polaris, the polar willow, is a species of willow with a circumpolar distribution in the high arctic tundra, extending north to the limits of land, and south of the Arctic in the mountains of Norway, the northern Ural Mountains, the northern Altay Mountains, Kamchatka, and British Columbia, Canada.

Description
The leaves are rounded-ovate, 5–32 mm long and 8–18 mm broad, dark green with entire margins. It is dioecious, with separate female and male plants. The flowers are grouped in short catkins each bearing only a few flowers. The fruit is a brownish and hairy capsule. The long runners with freely rooting stems creep in mats of mosses and lichens, which keeps them together and protects them from the wind. It grows as well in open gravel as in closed vegetation.

Fossil remains of the species from the Pleistocene ice ages are known in Europe south to southern England, the Alps, and the Carpathians.

The species has also been reported from Arizona, but this is not accepted by the USDA.

References

polaris
Flora of the Arctic
Flora of Subarctic America
Flora of Northern Europe
Flora of the Russian Far East
Flora of Siberia
Flora of Western Canada
Flora without expected TNC conservation status